The Soài Rạp is a river in Nhà Bè district, south of Ho Chi Minh City, Vietnam.

History
According to Pétrus Ky, the name Soài Rạp comes from the Khmer language word Pam Preak Kroy Phkam.

It joins the Vàm Cỏ in the Cần Giờ Mangrove Forest.

An international port in the Soài Rạp river, Hiệp Phước, can accommodate boats of up to 50,000 tons.  It began operations on 21 June 2014 and will be upgraded to accommodate vessels of up to 70,000 tons in the near future.

See also
 Cần Giờ

References

Rivers of Ho Chi Minh City
Rivers of Vietnam